
Year 50 BC was a year of the pre-Julian Roman calendar. At the time, it was known as the Year of the Consulship of Paullus and Marcellus (or, less frequently, year 704 Ab urbe condita). The denomination 50 BC for this year has been used since the early medieval period, when the Anno Domini calendar era became the prevalent method in Europe for naming years.

Events 
 By place 

 Roman Republic 
 Consuls: Lucius Aemilius Paullus and Gaius Claudius Marcellus.
 The Senate refuses Julius Caesar's permission to stand for consul in absentia, and demands that he lay down his command.
 The Roman artillery piece called Scorpio is invented.
 Initiation Rites of the Cult of Bacchus, detail of a wall painting in the Villa of the Mysteries, Pompeii, is made (approximate date).
 The Roman Republic takes control of Judea (approximate date).

Births 
 Antonia, daughter of Mark Antony
 Gaius Antistius Vetus, Roman consul (d. 1 AD)
 Shammai, Jewish scholar and rabbi (d. 30 AD)

Deaths 
 Aristobulus II, king of Judea
 Quintus Hortensius, Roman orator and advocate (b. 114 BC)

In fiction 
 The Asterix comic books are all set around this year.

References